The ear is the sense organ that detects sound.

Ear, EAR, or The Ear may also refer to:

Arts, entertainment, and media
 EAR (band) (Experimental Audio Research), a project by musician Peter Kember
 EAR Magazine, a monthly music magazine published 1973–1992
 The Ear, 1970 Czech film

Economics and finance
 Economic activity rate,  percentage of the population who constitutes the manpower supply of the labor market
 Effective annual rate of interest

Government and politics
 EAR, an acronym for the Greek Left party
 European Agency for Reconstruction or EAR, a European Union agency
 Export Administration Regulations or EAR, a short name for the US Code of Federal Regulations Title 15 chapter VII, subchapter C

Science
 Ear (botany), the seed-bearing part of a cereal plant, such as wheat
 Ear of corn, the grain-bearing part of the maize plant
 Ear moth or Amphipoea oculea, a moth in the family Noctuidae
 East African Rift or EAR, a tectonic rift zone
 eps-Associated RNA element (or EAR), a motif associated with exopolysaccharide biosynthesis
 Estimated Average Requirements (or EAR) for nutritional needs

Transport 
 EAR, the FAA and IATA location identifier for Kearney Regional Airport, Nebraska, US
 EAR, the National Rail code for Earley railway station, Berkshire, UK

Other uses
 EAR (file format) ("Enterprise ARchive" format), a file format used to package Java programming language applications
 Ear (mathematics), a type of polygon vertex
 Ear (rune), rune of the Anglo-Saxon futhorc
 East Area Rapist, a serial killer and rapist active in California between 1974 and 1986
 Expired air resuscitation (or EAR), also known as rescue breathing

See also
 EARS (disambiguation)